Peter Vaughan, DD (28 March 1770 – 12 July 1826) was an English clergyman and academic.

Vaughan was born in Leicester and educated at Merton College, Oxford, matriculating in 1787 and graduating B.A. in 1790. A Fellow from 1792, he rose there to the post of Warden in 1810. He also held livings at High Offley, Northenden and St John the Baptist, Oxford. He was Dean of Chester from 1820 until his death.

References

1770 births
19th-century English Anglican priests
Deans of Chester
Fellows of Merton College, Oxford
Wardens of Merton College, Oxford
People from Leicester
1826 deaths